Kaprije is an island in the Croatian part of the Adriatic Sea. It is situated in Šibenik archipelago. The island is composed of hills divided by transversal and longitudinal valleys where grass and sparse pine forests grow. Grapes and olives are cultivated there. The main industries are agriculture, fishing and tourism. Automobiles are not allowed on the island.

In 14th and 15th century the island belonged to noble families from Šibenik. During Ottoman conquests in 16th and 17th century, the island is inhabited by refugees from mainland. Around that time, a Saint Peter's church was built on the island.

References

Further reading
 

Islands of Croatia
Islands of the Adriatic Sea
Populated places in Šibenik-Knin County